Konstantinos Konstantinou (born 12 March 1962) is a Cypriot judoka. He competed in the men's half-lightweight event at the 1980 Summer Olympics.

References

1962 births
Living people
Cypriot male judoka
Olympic judoka of Cyprus
Judoka at the 1980 Summer Olympics
Place of birth missing (living people)